Esfand (also known as Espān, Ispān, and Ispand) is a village in Jolgeh-ye Chah Hashem Rural District, Jolgeh-ye Chah Hashem District, Dalgan County, Sistan and Baluchestan Province, Iran. At the 2006 census, its population was 2,469, with 447 families.

References 

Populated places in Dalgan County